William Wallis may refer to:

William Wallis (cricketer) (1878–1939), English cricketer
Bill Wallis (1936–2013), British actor and comedian

See also
William Wallace (disambiguation)